Warwick Tainton (19 June 1930 – 11 November 1982) was a South African cricketer. He played in twenty-three first-class matches for Border from 1949/50 to 1961/62.

See also
 List of Border representative cricketers

References

External links
 

1930 births
1982 deaths
South African cricketers
Border cricketers